Parker Frederick Porter (born April 22, 1985) is an American mixed martial artist who competes in the Heavyweight division of the Ultimate Fighting Championship.

Background
Porter played baseball, lacrosse and football in his youth. After high school Porter begun working out to lose weight, eventually dabbling to mixed martial arts for training variation at the age of 21.

Mixed martial arts career

Early career
Porter made his professional MMA debut on October 13, 2007, at a Revere, Massachusetts night club, where he won the fight by KO in the third round. He was paid $300 for the bout and fought in front of 30 people.

Afterwards, he compiled a 5–2 record in various regional organizations, with one of those losses being to future UFC Light Heavyweight and Heavyweight Champion Jon Jones, which occurred in Porter's only Light Heavyweight bout, where he was knocked out in the first minute after a botched weightcut. During this period, he also captured the Reality Fighting Heavyweight Championship by knocking out Mike Dexter.

Porter would defend the Reality Fighting Heavyweight Championship against Gabriel Gonzaga, who was returning after a layoff and in between UFC stints. Porter would lose the bout after he was submitted with an arm-triangle choke in the third round, losing the Reality Fighting Heavyweight Championship.

Porter would sign with Bellator MMA and made his Bellator debut against Josh Diekmann on September 7, 2013, at Bellator 98, losing via TKO in the first round.

After a layoff of almost a year and half, he made his sophomore bout for Bellator on July 17, 2015, at Bellator 140 against Eric Bedard. He won the bout via second round anaconda submission.

He had a layoff off almost 3 years due to personal issues and having to secure his family financially, he returned January 6, 2018 at Reality Fighting where he won by 3rd-round TKO against J.A. Dudley.

Porter made his CES MMA debut against Keith Bell on November 2, 2018, at CES MMA 53. Parker Porter was seemingly on his way to a first-round victory via ground-and-pound blows. However, referee Kevin MacDonald warned him several times about punching to the back of the head and eventually called for time at the 2:30 mark of the first round. When Bell was deemed unfit to continue, he was awarded the win via disqualification.

Porter faced Kevin Ray Sears on May 31, 2019, at CES MMA 56. In a dominant performance, Porter finished Sears via 2nd round kimura.

Porter faced Dirlei Broenstrup on September 7, 2019, at CES MMA 58. He won via 3rd-round TKO.

Ultimate Fighting Championship
Porter made his UFC debut on nine days' notice against Chris Daukaus on August 15, 2020, at UFC 252. He lost the fight via TKO in round one.

Porter faced Josh Parisian on November 28, 2020, at UFC on ESPN: Smith vs. Clark. He won the bout by unanimous decision.	

Porter was scheduled to face Chase Sherman on April 17, 2021, at UFC on ESPN 22. However, he was removed from the event for undisclosed reasons and was replaced by Andrei Arlovski.

Porter faced Chase Sherman on August 21, 2021, at UFC on ESPN 29. He won the fight via unanimous decision.

Porter faced Alan Baudot on February 19, 2022, at UFC Fight Night: Walker vs. Hill. He won the fight via unanimous decision.

Porter faced Jailton Almeida on May 21, 2022, at UFC Fight Night 206. He lost the fight via rear-naked choke in round one.

Porter was scheduled to face Hamdy Abdelwahab on October 22, 2022, at UFC 280. However, Abdelwahab was removed from the event for unknown reasons and he was replaced by Slim Trabelsi. In turn, the pairing was cancelled altogether as Trabelsi pulled out due to contractual issues with ARES FC and Porter opted to pursue a later fight, rather than a replacement barring unforeseen circumstances.

Porter faced Justin Tafa on February 12, 2023, at UFC 284. He lost the fight via knockout in the first round.

Personal life
Porter has twin boys born in 2013 and third son, Charlie (born 2020).

Championships and achievements

Mixed martial arts
Reality Fighting 
Reality Fighting Heavyweight Championship (One time)

Mixed martial arts record

|-
|Loss
|align=center|12–8
|Justin Tafa
|KO (punches)
|UFC 284
|
|align=center|1
|align=center|1:06
|Perth, Australia 
|
|-
|Loss
|align=center|12–7
|Jailton Almeida
|Submission (rear-naked choke)
|UFC Fight Night: Holm vs. Vieira
|
|align=center|1
|align=center|4:35
|Las Vegas, Nevada, United States
|
|-
|Win
|align=center|12–6
|Alan Baudot
| Decision (unanimous)
|UFC Fight Night: Walker vs. Hill
|
|align=center|3
|align=center|5:00
|Las Vegas, Nevada, United States
|
|-
|Win
| align=center|11–6
|Chase Sherman
|Decision (unanimous)
|UFC on ESPN: Cannonier vs. Gastelum
|
|align=center|3
|align=center|5:00
|Las Vegas, Nevada, United States
|
|-
|Win
|align=center|10–6
|Josh Parisian
|Decision (unanimous)
|UFC on ESPN: Smith vs. Clark
|
|align=center|3
|align=center|5:00
|Las Vegas, Nevada, United States
|
|-
|Loss
|align=center|9–6
|Chris Daukaus
|TKO (punches and knee)
|UFC 252
|
|align=center|1
|align=center|4:28
|Las Vegas, Nevada, United States
|
|-
|Win
|align=center|9–5
|Dirlei Broenstrup
|TKO (punches)
|CES MMA 58: De Jesus vs. Lozano
|
|align=center|3
|align=center|3:17
|Hartford, Connecticut, United States
|
|-
|Win
|align=center|8–5
|Kevin Ray Sears
|Submission (kimura)
|CES MMA 56: Boyington vs. Dubuque
|
|align=center|2
|align=center|2:29
|Hartford, Connecticut, United States
|
|-
|Loss
|align=center|7–5
|Keith Bell
|DQ (punches to back of head)
|CES MMA 53: Gravely vs. Nordby
|
|align=center|1
|align=center|2:30
|Lincoln, Rhode Island, United States
|
|-
|Win
|align=center|7–4
|J.A. Dudley
|TKO (punches)
|Reality Fighting: Mohegan Sun
|
|align=center|3
|align=center|1:16
|Uncasville, Connecticut, United States
|
|-
|Win
|align=center|6–4
|Eric Bedard
|Submission (keylock)
|Bellator 140
|
|align=center|2
|align=center|2:51
|Uncasville, Connecticut, United States
|
|-
|Loss
|align=center|5–4
|Josh Diekmann
|TKO (punches)
|Bellator 98
|
|align=center|1
|align=center|1:12
|Uncasville, Connecticut, United States
|
|-
|Loss
|align=center|5–3
|Gabriel Gonzaga
|Submission (arm-triangle choke)
|Reality Fighting: Gonzaga vs. Porter
|
|align=center|3
|align=center|1:50
|Uncasville, Connecticut, United States
|
|-
|Win
|align=center|5–2
|Mike Dexter
|KO (punches)
|Reality Fighting: Mohegan Sun 2
|
|align=center|1
|align=center|1:36
|Uncasville, Connecticut, United States
|
|-
|Loss
|align=center|4–2
|Gabriel Salinas-Jones
|Submission (neck crank)
|XFC 13: Unstoppable
|
|align=Center|1
|align=center|4:50
|Tampa, Florida, United States
|
|-
|Win
|align=center|4–1
|Lee Beane
|Submission (rear-naked choke)
|CES MMA: First Blood
|
|align=center|1
|align=center|2:36
|Lincoln, Rhode Island, United States
|
|-
|Win
|align=center|3–1
|Mark Hoxie
|TKO (submission to punches)
|Reality Fighting: Ferocity
|
|align=center|1
|align=center|1:09
|Plymouth, Massachusetts, United States
|
|-
|Loss
|align=center|2–1
|Jon Jones
|KO (punch)
|World Championship Fighting 3
|
|align=center|1
|align=center|0:36
|Wilmington, Massachusetts, United States
|
|-
|Win
|align=center|2–0
|Randy Smith
|Decision (unanimous)
|CZ 25: Cage Masters 4
|
|align=center|3
|align=center|4:00
|Revere, Massachusetts, United States
|
|-
|Win
|align=center|1–0
|Kiplagott Stewart
|KO (punches)
|CZ 24: Renaissance
|
|align=center|3
|align=center|0:16
|Revere, Massachusetts, United States
|

See also 
 List of current UFC fighters
 List of male mixed martial artists

References

External links 
  
 

1985 births
Living people
American male mixed martial artists
Heavyweight mixed martial artists
Mixed martial artists utilizing Brazilian jiu-jitsu
Ultimate Fighting Championship male fighters
Mixed martial artists from Connecticut
American practitioners of Brazilian jiu-jitsu